Matsudo International High School (松戸国際高等学校) is a high school located in Matsudo, Chiba Prefecture, Japan. It has a great focus on international culture.

History 
In 1973, Matsudo Higashi High School was opened.

In 1994, the International Culture Department was installed and the school's name was changed to "Matsudo International High School".

Curriculum 
This school has a Regular and International Course. Each course has English classes every day for first year students.

The Regular Course of this school is a little different. The number of English classes is larger than other schools. In the International Course second and third year students can take a second language, for example Chinese, French and Korean.

Buildings 
One of the popular buildings of this school is Esperanza. Students often eat lunch there. There are 2 buildings for students and teachers There is a building for Physical Education and club activities called Koshikan. There are two gyms, both large and small. The school is clean. There is a field and tennis court.

Faculty 
Four Assistant Language Teachers teach English with many experienced English teachers. There are also French, Chinese, and Korean teachers. Teachers who have knowledge such as Japanese Culture, Cross Cultural Understanding, Presentation, and English Conversation are in charge of the classes. There are not only English related teachers but also math, biology, chemistry, geography, history, Japanese, physical education, literature, music, art, home economics, and craft teachers.

School Trip 
The second year students usually go to Taiwan. Most schools go to Okinawa but Matsudo International High School students can go abroad. Students go to a Taiwanese school and communicate with them with the goal of learning about Taiwan's culture.

Student life
Homeroom starts at 08:35. Usually a class is 50 minutes. Lunchtime starts at 12:35 and finishes at 13:20. After school starts at 16:10 on Monday and Wednesday. On the remaining weekdays it ends at 15:10. The school has many events. For example, The School Festival, Sports Festival, Halloween Party, Ball Game Festival, School Trip, Student Exchange, and four term exams.

Access 
You can go to Matsudo International High School from Shin-Yahashira Station by walking. It takes 30 minutes on foot. By bicycle it takes 15 minutes. By bus it takes 10 minutes and another 10 minutes by foot.

From Matsuhidai Station by foot it is 25 minutes and by bicycle it is 10 minutes.

From Goko Station, by foot it is 25 minutes. By bicycle it is 10 minutes.

Most people use bicycle from Shin-Yahashira Station to reach the school.

High schools in Chiba Prefecture